Scoparia jiuzhaiensis is a moth in the family Crambidae. It was described by Wei-Chun Li, Hou-Hun Li and Matthias Nuss in 2010. It is found in Sichuan, China.

The length of the forewings is 8.5–10.5 mm. The forewings are pale brown, suffused with black scales. The antemedian and postmedian lines are white. The hindwings are white, slightly suffused with pale brown at the termen.

Etymology
The species name refers to the type locality, Jiuzhai in Sichuan province.

References

Moths described in 2010
Scorparia